Road Movie is a 2002 South Korean film about a love triangle between a woman, a man who loves her, and a gay man who loves him. Living on the margins of society, they go on a road trip together.

Cast 
 Hwang Jung-min ... Dae-shik
 Jung Chan ... Suk-won
 Seo Lin ... Il-joo
 Jung Hyung-gi ... Min-seok
 Bang Eun-jin ... Jung-in
 Kim Gi-cheon ... Jo-si

References

External links
 
 
 
 
 Road Movie review at Koreanfilm.org

2002 films
2000s Korean-language films
LGBT-related drama films
South Korean LGBT-related films
South Korean road movies
2000s road movies
South Korean romantic drama films
2002 romantic drama films
2002 LGBT-related films
2000s South Korean films